"Face the Face" is a song by Pete Townshend. The song is the third track on Townshend's fourth solo album, a concept album titled White City: A Novel, and was released as a single. The UK and US single edit features Pete Townshend's daughter Emma Townshend singing some parts on the song.

The single reached number 26 on the US singles chart and number 3 on Billboards Mainstream Rock chart, along with achieving top 20 status in Australia, New Zealand and several European territories, but did not share the same success in the UK, only peaking there at number 89.

Background
When Pete Townshend was asked about the song he said:

Release
In the US, the single had a different take which had bad sound compared to the UK release and the packaging for the US promo single said:

Reception
Cash Box called it a "playful upbeat track...with strong emphasis on a high energy marching drum groove and playful vocal mix."  Billboard called it a "a high-powered explosion at a feverish tempo."

Music video
Geoffrey Giuliano in his book, Behind Blues Eyes: The Life of Pete Townshend (2002), described "[T]he highlight of the video is the poolside staging of the electric 'Face the Face', in which director Richard Lowenstein effectively captures the excitement of a big-band performance and Townshend's joyous jitterbugging ... in a gold lamé, forties-style tuxedo Lowenstein reveals more story line in these five minutes than the entire video". It was released with Townshend's concept album, White City: A Novel, and included his discussing the music.

Chart performance

Weekly charts

Year-end charts

References

External links

1985 singles
1985 songs
Atco Records singles
Pete Townshend songs
Songs written by Pete Townshend
Song recordings produced by Chris Thomas (record producer)